Lisa Bufano (October 20, 1972 – October 3, 2013) was an American interdisciplinary performance artist whose work incorporated elements of doll-making, fabric work, animation, and dance.

Early life
Born to Louis A. Bufano and Elizabeth "Betty" Bufano in 1972 in Bridgeport, Connecticut, Lisa graduated from Tufts University in 2003, and later from the School of the Museum of Fine Arts, Boston (SMFA). A competitive gymnast as a child (and a go-go dancer in college), she became a bilateral below-the-knee and total finger-thumb amputee due to a life-threatening staphylococcus bacterial infection at the age of 21.

Career
After losing her lower legs and most of her fingers and thumbs, Bufano began her performance and dancing career when a professor at the University of Linz doing research on the lives of amputees discovered her web page and offered her a stipend to perform in Vienna. She toured from 2006 to 2010 with the AXIS Dance Company, performing works variously choreographed by Victoria Marks, Joe Goode, and Kate Weare to audiences in Austria, Croatia, Slovenia, and Canada, and performed to a packed house at the John F. Kennedy Center for the Performing Arts in a program honoring fellow amputee and dancer Homer Avila (featured in Modern Dance Videos) as well as at the Baryshnikov Arts Center and Judson Memorial Church, among other venues.

Her dance work typically incorporated a variety of prosthetics and props (such as using wooden Queen Anne table legs as legs and arms), but also included segments where her unadorned body was the focus of the performance. According to Bufano she manipulated her body as a way to explore alternative locomotion (at age 34 she ran several miles a day on high-tech carbon fiber prosthetic legs), corporeal difference, her sexual identity (an aspect of her work which was of particular interest to the artistic LGBT community), and animation/manipulation, interests which led to many fruitful collaborations.

Bufano listed among her influences medical drawings, historical wax models and  dolls, and optical toys; flip dolls and paper dolls; the structural aspects of Japanese jointed dolls, Hans Bellmer's doll work, Louise Bourgeois' cell installations, and the animation of Jan Švankmajer and the Quay Brothers. One of her main projects was a white muslin dress which turned into a squid, for which she sewed thousands of detailed suckers. "She loved sewing sculptures made of fabric," her brother remarked in a remembrance. "She had a thing for the creepy-cute, the exotic, the bizarre. Things that were dark but also beautiful.

She explained her aesthetic and political goals when she claimed that:

She likewise explained during her time at the School of the Museum of Fine Arts, Boston:

She has had an artist residency at the Contemporary Artists Center, North Adams; and also at the 8th Street Air Program (2010), Boise, Idaho. She was a Franklin Furnace Fund recipient in 2006–2007.

Originally based in Boston, Massachusetts, and relocated to San Francisco, California in December 2012.

Death and legacy
Lisa Bufano committed suicide on October 3, 2013, in San Francisco, California; no suicide note was found. Two months later, her brother reflected on the inexplicable nature of her death.

More than a year after her death, her work, along with that by Cara Levine, Shari Paladino and Sadie Wilcox, was included in Four Choreographies at the Worth Ryder Art Gallery in Berkeley, California. A further retrospective was held Storefront Lab in San Francisco in 2015.

References

External links

A short interview (video, 2013)
Five Open Mouths, her signature piece (video, 2006)

American female dancers
American dancers
American amputees
Artists from Bridgeport, Connecticut
Interdisciplinary artists
Dancers with disabilities
Tufts University alumni
School of the Museum of Fine Arts at Tufts alumni
1972 births
2013 deaths
Suicides in California
Quadruple amputees
Dancers from Connecticut
2013 suicides
21st-century American women